Edward Schaumberg Quade (June 28, 1908 – June 4, 1988) was an American mathematician at the Rand Corporation who worked on trigonometric series and systems analysis.

References

20th-century American mathematicians
1908 births
1988 deaths
People from Jacksonville, Florida
RAND Corporation people
Mathematicians from Florida